"Hyperreal" is a song by Australian musician Flume. It features vocals from Kučka. It was released on 5 May 2017. The song is included on the vinyl release of Skin Companion EP 2 (2017).

It marks the third collaboration between Flume and Kučka, following "Smoke & Retribution" and "Numb & Getting Colder", on Skin.

Reception
A Triple J reviewer said "It's a thumping, glitchy club track packed with bass and off kilter syncopation. Flume has woven explosions, claps, distortion and kick drums together with Kučka's soprano to create an unnerving, deep dark beast."

Charts

References

2017 singles
2017 songs
Flume (musician) songs
Future Classic singles
Kučka songs
Song recordings produced by Flume (musician)
Songs written by Flume (musician)
Songs written by Kučka